Berka may refer to:

Places in Germany
Bad Berka, in the Weimarer Land district, Thuringia
Berka/Werra, in the Wartburgkreis district, Thuringia
Berka vor dem Hainich, in the Wartburgkreis district, Thuringia
Berka (river), a river in Hesse

Other
Berka of Dubá, medieval Czech aristocracy
Al-Berka, an administrative division of Benghazi, Libya

See also
Burqa, a type of garment